Pyxiloricaria menezesi is the only species of the monotypic genus Pyxiloricaria, a genus of the family Loricariidae of catfish (order Siluriformes).

This species is endemic to Brazil where it occurs in the Paraguay River drainage. P. menezesi inhabits sandy substrates and is sympatric with representatives of the genus Pseudohemiodon.

P. menezesi reaches a length of  SL. The phylogenetic position is uncertain; although it is thought to be closely related to Pseudohemiodon, it shares with Loricaria filamentous lips, inconspicuous fringed barbels on the lower lip, and shorter maxillary barbels.

References

Loricariini
Fish of South America
Fish of Brazil
Endemic fauna of Brazil
Taxa named by Isaäc J. H. Isbrücker
Taxa named by Han Nijssen
Monotypic freshwater fish genera
Catfish genera